Jacob Louis Veldhuyzen van Zanten (5 February 1927 – 27 March 1977) was a Dutch aircraft captain and flight instructor. He was captain of the KLM Flight 4805 and died in the Tenerife airport disaster, the deadliest accident in aviation history. He was KLM's chief instructor and commonly appeared on advertising.

Biography
Born in Lisse, Netherlands, Veldhuyzen van Zanten obtained his private pilot's licence on 21 June 1947, and his commercial pilot's licence on 18 April 1950.  That year, he began working for KLM Royal Dutch Airlines as a flight director, and in 1951, he commenced duty as a first officer on the Douglas DC-3. He then obtained his Flight Radio Telephone Operator's Licence on 22 September 1952, Airline Transport Pilot's Licence on 19 October 1956, and Flight Navigator's Licence on 6 August 1963.

On 23 January 1971, Veldhuyzen van Zanten was type-rated on the Boeing 747. Later that year, he and two colleagues went to Seattle to take delivery of KLM’s first 747, the Mississippi (registered PH-BUA). At the time of the disaster, he had 11,700 flight hours (1,545 of which were on the Boeing 747). In addition to his duties as a regular airline pilot, he had been promoted to chief flight instructor for the Boeing 747. At the time of his death, he was in charge of training all of KLM's pilots on this type of aircraft and the head of KLM's flight training department.

Jan Bartelski, a KLM captain until 1978 and later president of the International Federation of Air Line Pilots' Associations, was a contemporary of Veldhuyzen van Zanten and knew him personally. In his book Disasters In The Air, he describes Veldhuyzen van Zanten as:  
And adds that: 

Shortly before the Tenerife airport disaster, in which he was involved, Veldhuyzen van Zanten was photographed for KLM's advertising campaign. While this has been attributed to his high position within KLM, Jan Bartelski, for instance, argues that Veldhuyzen van Zanten was photographed simply because he was the only captain available (due to his responsibilities as a flight instructor) to KLM Public Relations, as others were away flying.

When the news of the Tenerife disaster broke, the KLM executives looked for Veldhuyzen van Zanten to lead their investigation, only to realize that he had been killed in the accident.

Veldhuyzen van Zanten lived in Sassenheim, Netherlands, with his wife and two children.

Tenerife disaster and death 
 

The Tenerife airport disaster on 27 March 1977 was the collision of two Boeing 747 passenger aircraft on the runway of Los Rodeos Airport (now known as Tenerife North Airport) in Tenerife, Spain; killing 583 people, the crash is the deadliest accident in aviation history. All 248 passengers and crew aboard KLM flight 4805 were killed, as were 335 on Pan Am flight 1736 (61 survived).
 
In heavy fog on the airport's only runway, Veldhuyzen van Zanten took off without approval and crashed into the top of the Pan Am aircraft, which was backtaxiing in the opposite direction under the direction of air traffic control. The KLM's flight crew had been aware of Pan Am backtaxiing behind them, but believed that it had already cleared the runway - the dense fog prevented visual confirmation. Veldhuyzen van Zanten's actions were the result of a number of other factors, including communication difficulties with Air Traffic Control (accents, and non-standard phraseology); he was impatient and concerned about having to stay any longer in Tenerife when he received a departure clearance but not a take-off clearance yet, and the Control Tower assumed that the KLM 747 remained stationary on the runway as instructed.

Aircraft type ratings
Veldhuyzen van Zanten was rated for the following aircraft:
 Douglas DC-3 from 28 September 1951 to 20 June 1962
 Convair CV240/340 from 23 August 1952 to 20 June 1962
 Lockheed Constellation from 1 October 1952 to 20 June 1962
 Douglas DC-6 from 12 February 1957 to 20 June 1962
 Douglas DC-7C from 6 June 1957 to 20 June 1962
 Vickers Viscount 803 from 11 June 1959 to 21 July 1967
 Douglas DC-9 from 16 March 1967 to 9 June 1971
 Boeing 747 from 23 January 1971 to 27 March 1977

References

External links

1927 births
1977 deaths
People from Lisse
Aviators killed in aviation accidents or incidents in Spain
Dutch aviators
Commercial aviators
Dutch flight instructors
Victims of aviation accidents or incidents in 1977